Marquis  was a Japanese imperial bureaucrat and university professor.

Biography 
Matsudaira was born in 1893 as the son of Matsudaira Yasutaka.  His sister Toshiko married Takakimi Mitsui.

In 1905, Matsudaira graduated from Tōkyō Kōtō Shihan Gakkō's attached elementary school (now University of Tsukuba elementary school), going on to graduate from its affiliated junior high school (currently Junior and Senior High School at Otsuka) in 1912. After graduating from Kyoto Imperial University's faculty of law in 1919, he gave lectures at Meiji University and Nihon University. He studied abroad in the United Kingdom and France in 1924. On 15 December 1930, he inherited the family after his father's death.

On 13 June 1936, Matsudaira was appointed as Kido's chief secretary in the Naidaijin.  He retired from that position on 24 November 1945, and on 17 January 1946, he assumed the presidency of the Bureau of Peerage until it was abolished in 1947.

Matsudaira was one of the central aides of Hirohito and the Imperial House of Japan, and after the end of World War II, he contacted the Supreme Commander for the Allied Powers and testified against the International Military Tribunal for the Far East. In 1949, he also drafted The Japanese Emperor and the War, in which he described the Emperor's views of the war in regards to "numerous events of great historical significance."

On 27 March 1947, Matsudaira assumed his position as the Grand Master of the Ceremonies.  He died while serving in this position on 4 January 1957.

See also 
 Joseph B. Keenan

References 

1893 births
1957 deaths
Fukui-Matsudaira clan
Kazoku
Kyoto University alumni
Academic staff of Meiji University
Academic staff of Nihon University